The 2016 Svenska Cupen final was played on 5 May 2016. The match was played at Swedbank Stadion, Malmö, the home ground of Malmö FF, determined in a draw on 21 March 2016 after the semi-finals. The final was the culmination of the 2015–16 Svenska Cupen.

Allsvenskan clubs Malmö FF and BK Häcken contested the 2016 final, with the winner earning a place in the second qualifying round of the 2016–17 UEFA Europa League. Malmö FF played their first final since 1996 and their 18th final in total, BK Häcken played their first final since 1990 and their second final in total. BK Häcken won their first Svenska Cupen title after defeating Malmö FF 6–5 on penalties after the match had finished 2–2 after extra time.

Route to the final

Note: In all results below, the score of the finalist is given first.

Match

Details

See also
2015–16 Svenska Cupen

References

2016
Cup
Malmö FF matches
BK Häcken matches
Sports competitions in Malmö
May 2016 sports events in Europe
2010s in Malmö
Svenska Cupen Final 2016